Higham Lane School is a secondary academy school in Weddington, Nuneaton, England. Appointed in 2022, the school's headteacher is Nick Haddon, taking over from Phil Kelly who had been headteacher of the school for 16 years and retired at the end of August 2022. Peter Banks is the current acting head of the school with Hanif Ladha as the Assistant Head and Head of the Sixth form.  The school teaches students aged between eleven and eighteen, (Key Stage 3 and Key Stage 4) in preparation for their GCSEs.

The original school building dates back to 1939, with the introduction of new laboratories, a sports hall and a new Business and Enterprise Centre arriving since. In 2003, after a successful bid, the school was granted Business and Enterprise College status, under the specialist schools programme. In January 2012, the school officially gained Academy status.

History

In 2003, Higham Lane became a Business and Enterprise specialist school, under the specialist schools programme. As part of the programme, the school received an additional £500,000 in funding as well as a capital grant of £100,000 in order to fund the construction of a "Business and Enterprise Centre".

School farm

In the 1970s and 80s, the school became well known for the smallholding established by former teacher, John Terry, which he went on to write about in several books (Pigs in the Playground, Calves in the Classroom, Ducks in Detention & Rabbits on Report – published by Farming Press Books). Queen Elizabeth II visited Nuneaton for the first time in December 1994, and when visiting the school, she presented a calf to the school farm and opened the school's new science block. The school farm continued to operate until Terry's retirement in 1998, where it has since struggled due to lack of funding.

The area where the school farm was located became a school garden that included two ponds and an aviary of budgies. Teacher, Alex Faulds, ran the garden with the help of a small group of students. The garden won the Secondary school category for Nuneaton's Britain in Bloom, five years in a row, but closed at the end of the school year, in 2008.

Sixth form

In 2016, the school constructed a new £1.6 million sixth form building. The building has the potential to accommodate three hundred students. It contains seventeen teaching rooms in addition to two science labs, an art room and a common room.

The building 
The two main sections of the building are Coombe to the east, and Chine to the west (both of which take their names from types of geographical feature found on the Isle of Wight, continuing a theme found in the street names in the vicinity of the school). The school was originally three different schools, with no physical link between Coombe and Chine. Chine initially housed Higham Lane Infant School, whose assembly hall is now the library, and Higham Lane Junior School, whose assembly hall is now Chine Hall, while Coombe housed a secondary modern school Higham Lane High School. These three schools closed and were then combined to form one Comprehensive school, following a major re-organisation of schools in Warwickshire in the early 1970s.

Additions to these two core buildings include dedicated classrooms for subjects requiring special equipment, such as design and technology (in particular, resistant materials, graphic design and food technology, all of which are on the north side of Coombe), science (situated to the north-east of Coombe) and physical education (to the north-east and south-east of Coombe). Other major subjects, such as English, mathematics and history, are taught in classrooms in the main body of Coombe and Chine.

Notable alumni 
Gareth Edwards – Director of Monsters, Godzilla, and Rogue One
Jon Holmes – BAFTA award-winning writer, comedian and broadcaster. Writer of Horrible Histories.
Wally Holmes – rugby union player
Lauren Samuels – West End Actress. Runner up on Over The Rainbow.
Hasnain Khan – Medical student awarded a British Empire Medal (BEM) for services during the Covid-19 pandemic.

References

External links 
 
 Higham Lane School OFSTED reports

Academies in Warwickshire
Educational institutions established in 1939
Secondary schools in Warwickshire
1939 establishments in England
Nuneaton